Solly Tolchinsky (2 January 1929 – 1 December 2020) was a Canadian basketball player who competed in the 1948 Summer Olympics. Born in Montreal, Quebec, he was part of the Canadian basketball team, which finished ninth in the Olympic tournament. His brother was Jewish comedy writer Mel Tolkin. 

Tochinsky died from complications of COVID-19 in Montreal on 1 December 2020, at the age of 91, during the COVID-19 pandemic in Montreal. He was the son of Nessie Cartman and Mendel "Max" Tolchinsky, a labourer and door-to-door salesman.

References

1929 births
2020 deaths
Anglophone Quebec people
Basketball players from Montreal
Basketball players at the 1948 Summer Olympics
Canadian men's basketball players
Canadian people of Ukrainian-Jewish descent
Jewish Canadian sportspeople
Jewish men's basketball players
Olympic basketball players of Canada
Deaths from the COVID-19 pandemic in Canada